Hoy is an island in Orkney, Scotland. 

Hoy may also refer to:

People

Given name 
 Hoy Phallin (born 1995), Cambodian footballer
 Hoy Wong (1920–2009), American bartender

Surname 
 Hoy (surname), an Irish surname
 Høy, a Danish and Norwegian surname

Places
 Hoy (hamlet), a location on the Orkney island of the same name in Scotland
 Hoy, Iran, usually romanized Khoy
 Hoy, an uninhabited island in Lake Constance, Germany
 Hoy, Shetland, a small island in the Shetland Islands, Scotland
 Hoy Sound, north of the island of Hoy
 Hoy, West Virginia, United States, an unincorporated community

Music 
 "Hoy" (song), a single by Gloria Estefan from her 2003 album, Unwrapped
 "Hoy", a song from the 2013 album Los Momentos by Julieta Venegas
 "Hoy", a song by Morbo from their eponymous 2001 album

Newspapers
 Hoy (Dominican Republic newspaper), published in Santo Domingo
 Hoy (Ecuadorian newspaper), based in Quito
 Hoy (Peruvian newspaper), published in Huánuco
 Hoy (Spanish newspaper), published in Extremadura
 Hoy (U.S. newspaper), a Spanish-language paper published in Chicago and Los Angeles

Other uses 
 Hoy (boat), a small sloop-rigged coasting ship or a heavy barge
 Hoy (TV program), a Mexican show
 Hoy Field, a baseball field in Ithaca, New York
 Hoy railway station, a closed station in Highland, Scotland
 hoy, ISO 639-3 code for the Holiya language, spoken in India

See also
 Ahoy (disambiguation)
 Hoys (disambiguation)
 Hoye, a surname
 Oi (disambiguation)
 Oy (disambiguation)